Intuition is the debut album by the Danish Eurodance producer DJ Encore featuring the vocals of singer Engelina. It was released in Denmark on 8 October 2001 and in the United States on 29 January 2002.

Track listing

Charts

Release history

References

External links
 Intuition at Discogs

2001 debut albums
DJ Encore albums
Trance albums